Montbau is a Barcelona Metro station, in the Horta-Guinardó district of Barcelona, and named after the nearby Montbau neighbourhood. The station is served by line L3.

The station is located underneath the Passeig de la Vall d'Hebron and the Ronda de Dalt expressway, between Carrer de l'Arquitectura and Carrer Pare Mariana. The station has a single ticket hall with two entrances; as the station is on a mountainside, one of the entrances is actually below the ticket hall level, requiring passengers to climb stairs up, but in August 2009 a new entrance has been open with no stairs to climb.

The station was opened in 1985, when the section of line L3 from Lesseps station was inaugurated. It remained the terminus of the line until the extension to Canyelles station opened in 2001.

References

External links
 
 Montbau at Trenscat.com

Barcelona Metro line 3 stations
Railway stations in Spain opened in 1985
Transport in Horta-Guinardó